The Badminton Federation of Tajikistan (BFT) is the highest national administrative organization in the sport of badminton in Tajikistan.

History
The Badminton Federation of Tajikistan was founded on 10 December 2010 and subsequently became a member of the Badminton World Federation. The Federation is also a member of the continental umbrella organization Badminton Asia. The association is based in Dushanbe. The association is registered with the Ministry of Justice of the country and is a member of the National Olympic Committee.

Notable members
 Kabir Jurazoda, president
 Jonathan Linus, general secretary

References

National members of the Badminton World Federation
Sports governing bodies in Tajikistan
Sports organizations established in 2010
2010 establishments in Tajikistan